Lional Deshaun "Jellyroll" Dalton (born February 21, 1975) is a former American football defensive tackle.

College career
After attending Cooley High School, Dalton was a three-year letterman and two-year starter at Eastern Michigan University, where he twice earned All-Mid-American Conference honors and was selected co-Defensive MVP as a senior in 1997.  He was also selected to play in the Hula Bowl All-Star Game. He posted 116 tackles, four sacks, and two forced fumbles in his college career.

While Eastern Michigan, Dalton became a member of Phi Beta Sigma fraternity (Zeta Epsilon chapter).

Professional career
Not selected in the 1998 NFL Draft, Dalton was signed as a free agent by the Baltimore Ravens and played with them through the 2001 season.  He won Super Bowl XXXV with the Baltimore Ravens. He then played for the Denver Broncos in 2002, the Washington Redskins in 2003, the Kansas City Chiefs from 2004 to 2006, and the Houston Texans in 2006.

Health issues
Dalton announced in 2021 that he had been diagnosed with end-stage kidney disease and needs a transplant. Due to his health issues, he's lost 120 pounds since he was first diagnosed with kidney disease. In late August 2021 he announced the successful transplant in a video on Twitter.

References

1975 births
Living people
Players of American football from Detroit
American football defensive tackles
Eastern Michigan University alumni
Eastern Michigan Eagles football players
Baltimore Ravens players
Denver Broncos players
Washington Redskins players
Kansas City Chiefs players
Houston Texans players